Botulinum toxin, or botulinum neurotoxin (BoNT), is a neurotoxic protein produced by the bacterium Clostridium botulinum and related species. It prevents the release of the neurotransmitter acetylcholine from axon endings at the neuromuscular junction, thus causing flaccid paralysis. The toxin causes the disease botulism. The toxin is also used commercially for medical and cosmetic purposes.

The seven main types of botulinum toxin are named types A to G (A, B, C1, C2, D, E, F and G). New types are occasionally found. Types A and B are capable of causing disease in humans, and are also used commercially and medically. Types C–G are less common; types E and F can cause disease in humans, while the other types cause disease in other animals.

Botulinum toxins are among the most potent toxins known. Intoxication can occur naturally as a result of either wound or intestinal infection or by ingesting formed toxin in food. The estimated human lethal dose of type A toxin is 1.3–2.1ng/kg intravenously or intramuscularly, 10–13ng/kg when inhaled, or 1000ng/kg when taken by mouth. Commercial forms are marketed under the brand names Botox (onabotulinumtoxinA), Dysport/Azzalure (abobotulinumtoxinA), Letybo (letibotulinumtoxinA), Myobloc (rimabotulinumtoxinB), Xeomin/Bocouture (incobotulinumtoxinA), and Jeuveau (prabotulinumtoxinA).

Medical uses
Botulinum toxin is used to treat a number of therapeutic indications, many of which are not part of the approved drug label.

Muscle spasticity
Botulinum toxin is used to treat a number of disorders characterized by overactive muscle movement, including cerebral palsy, post-stroke spasticity, post-spinal cord injury spasticity, spasms of the head and neck, eyelid, vagina, limbs, jaw, and vocal cords. Similarly, botulinum toxin is used to relax the clenching of muscles, including those of the esophagus, jaw, lower urinary tract and bladder, or clenching of the anus which can exacerbate anal fissure. Botulinum toxin appears to be effective for refractory overactive bladder.

Other muscle disorders
Strabismus, otherwise known as improper eye alignment, is caused by imbalances in the actions of muscles that rotate the eyes. This condition can sometimes be relieved by weakening a muscle that pulls too strongly, or pulls against one that has been weakened by disease or trauma. Muscles weakened by toxin injection recover from paralysis after several months, so injection might seem to need to be repeated, but muscles adapt to the lengths at which they are chronically held, so that if a paralyzed muscle is stretched by its antagonist, it grows longer, while the antagonist shortens, yielding a permanent effect. If binocular vision is good, the brain mechanism of motor fusion, which aligns the eyes on a target visible to both, can stabilize the corrected alignment.

In January 2014, botulinum toxin was approved by UK's Medicines and Healthcare products Regulatory Agency for treatment of restricted ankle motion due to lower-limb spasticity associated with stroke in adults.

In July 2016, the U.S. Food and Drug Administration (FDA) approved abobotulinumtoxinA (Dysport) for injection for the treatment of lower-limb spasticity in pediatric patients two years of age and older. AbobotulinumtoxinA is the first and only FDA-approved botulinum toxin for the treatment of pediatric lower limb spasticity. In the U.S., the FDA approves the text of the labels of prescription medicines and for which medical conditions the drug manufacturer may sell the drug. However, prescribers may freely prescribe them for any condition they wish, also known as off-label use. Botulinum toxins have been used off-label for several pediatric conditions, including infantile esotropia.

Excessive sweating
AbobotulinumtoxinA has been approved for the treatment of excessive underarm sweating of unknown cause, which cannot be managed by topical agents.

Migraine
In 2010, the FDA approved intramuscular botulinum toxin injections for prophylactic treatment of chronic migraine headache.

Cosmetic uses

In cosmetic applications, botulinum toxin is considered relatively safe and effective for reduction of facial wrinkles, especially in the uppermost third of the face. Commercial forms are marketed under the brand names Botox Cosmetic/Vistabel from Allergan, Dysport/Azzalure from Galderma and Ipsen, Xeomin/Bocouture from Merz, Jeuveau/Nuceiva from Evolus, manufactured by Daewoong in South Korea. The effects of botulinum toxin injections for glabellar lines ('11's lines' between the eyes) typically last two to four months and in some cases, product-dependent, with some patients experiencing a longer duration of effect of up to 6 months or longer. Injection of botulinum toxin into the muscles under facial wrinkles causes relaxation of those muscles, resulting in the smoothing of the overlying skin. Smoothing of wrinkles is usually visible three to five days after injection, with maximum effect typically a week following injection. Muscles can be treated repeatedly to maintain the smoothed appearance.

DaxibotulinumtoxinA (Daxxify) is used for the temporary improvement in the appearance of moderate to severe glabellar lines (eyebrows). DaxibotulinumtoxinA is an acetylcholine release inhibitor and neuromuscular blocking agent.

Other
Botulinum toxin is also used to treat disorders of hyperactive nerves including excessive sweating, neuropathic pain, and some allergy symptoms. In addition to these uses, botulinum toxin is being evaluated for use in treating chronic pain. Studies show that botulinum toxin may be injected into arthritic shoulder joints to reduce chronic pain and improve range of motion. The use of botulinum toxin A in children with cerebral palsy is safe in the upper and lower limb muscles.

Side effects
While botulinum toxin is generally considered safe in a clinical setting, serious side effects from its use can occur. Most commonly, botulinum toxin can be injected into the wrong muscle group or with time spread from the injection site, causing temporary paralysis of unintended muscles.

Side effects from cosmetic use generally result from unintended paralysis of facial muscles. These include partial facial paralysis, muscle weakness, and trouble swallowing. Side effects are not limited to direct paralysis, however, and can also include headaches, flu-like symptoms, and allergic reactions. Just as cosmetic treatments only last a number of months, paralysis side effects can have the same durations. At least in some cases, these effects are reported to dissipate in the weeks after treatment. Bruising at the site of injection is not a side effect of the toxin, but rather of the mode of administration, and is reported as preventable if the clinician applies pressure to the injection site; when it occurs, it is reported in specific cases to last 7–11 days. When injecting the masseter muscle of the jaw, loss of muscle function can result in a loss or reduction of power to chew solid foods. With continued high doses, the muscles can atrophy or lose strength; research has shown that those muscles rebuild after a break from Botox.

Side effects from therapeutic use can be much more varied depending on the location of injection and the dose of toxin injected. In general, side effects from therapeutic use can be more serious than those that arise during cosmetic use. These can arise from paralysis of critical muscle groups and can include arrhythmia, heart attack, and in some cases, seizures, respiratory arrest, and death. Additionally, side effects common in cosmetic use are also common in therapeutic use, including trouble swallowing, muscle weakness, allergic reactions, and flu-like syndromes.

In response to the occurrence of these side effects, in 2008, the FDA notified the public of the potential dangers of the botulinum toxin as a therapeutic. Namely, the toxin can spread to areas distant from the site of injection and paralyze unintended muscle groups, especially when used for treating muscle spasticity in children treated for cerebral palsy. In 2009, the FDA announced that boxed warnings would be added to available botulinum toxin products, warning of their ability to spread from the injection site. However, the clinical use of botulinum toxin A in cerebral palsy children has been proven to be safe with minimal side effects. Additionally, the FDA announced name changes to several botulinum toxin products, to emphasize that the products are not interchangeable and require different doses for proper use. Botox and Botox Cosmetic were given the generic name of onabotulinumtoxinA, Myobloc as rimabotulinumtoxinB, and Dysport retained its generic name of abobotulinumtoxinA. In conjunction with this, the FDA issued a communication to health care professionals reiterating the new drug names and the approved uses for each. A similar warning was issued by Health Canada in 2009, warning that botulinum toxin products can spread to other parts of the body.

Role in disease

Botulinum toxin produced by Clostridium botulinum is the cause of botulism. Humans most commonly ingest the toxin from eating improperly canned foods in which C. botulinum has grown. However, the toxin can also be introduced through an infected wound. In infants, the bacteria can sometimes grow in the intestines and produce botulinum toxin within the intestine and can cause a condition known as floppy baby syndrome. In all cases, the toxin can then spread, blocking nerves and muscle function. In severe cases, the toxin can block nerves controlling the respiratory system or heart, resulting in death.

Botulism can be difficult to diagnose, as it may appear similar to diseases such as Guillain–Barré syndrome, myasthenia gravis, and stroke. Other tests, such as brain scan and spinal fluid examination, may help to rule out other causes. If the symptoms of botulism are diagnosed early, various treatments can be administered. In an effort to remove contaminated food that remains in the gut, enemas or induced vomiting may be used. For wound infections, infected material may be removed surgically. Botulinum antitoxin is available and may be used to prevent the worsening of symptoms, though it will not reverse existing nerve damage. In severe cases, mechanical respiration may be used to support patients with respiratory failure. The nerve damage heals over time, generally over weeks to months. With proper treatment, the case fatality rate for botulinum poisoning can be greatly reduced.

Two preparations of botulinum antitoxins are available for treatment of botulism. Trivalent (serotypes A, B, E) botulinum antitoxin is derived from equine sources using whole antibodies. The second antitoxin is heptavalent botulinum antitoxin (serotypes A, B, C, D, E, F, G), which is derived from equine antibodies that have been altered to make them less immunogenic. This antitoxin is effective against all main strains of botulism.

Mechanism of action

Botulinum toxin exerts its effect by cleaving key proteins required for nerve activation. First, the toxin binds specifically to presynaptic surface of neurons that use the neurotransmitter acetylcholine. Once bound to the nerve terminal, the neuron takes up the toxin into a vesicle by receptor-mediated endocytosis. As the vesicle moves farther into the cell, it acidifies, activating a portion of the toxin that triggers it to push across the vesicle membrane and into the cell cytoplasm. Botulinum neurotoxins recognize distinct classes of receptors simultaneously (gangliosides, synaptotagmin and SV2). Once inside the cytoplasm, the toxin cleaves SNARE proteins (proteins that mediate vesicle fusion, with their target membrane bound compartments) meaning that the acetylcholine vesicles cannot bind to the intracellular cell membrane, preventing the cell from releasing vesicles of neurotransmitter. This stops nerve signaling, leading to paralysis.

The toxin itself is released from the bacterium as a single chain, then becomes activated when cleaved by its own proteases. The active form consists of a two-chain protein composed of a 100-kDa heavy chain polypeptide joined via disulfide bond to a 50-kDa light chain polypeptide. The heavy chain contains domains with several functions; it has the domain responsible for binding specifically to presynaptic nerve terminals, as well as the domain responsible for mediating translocation of the light chain into the cell cytoplasm as the vacuole acidifies. The light chain is a M27-family zinc metalloprotease and is the active part of the toxin. It is translocated into the host cell cytoplasm where it cleaves the host protein SNAP-25, a member of the SNARE protein family, which is responsible for fusion. The cleaved SNAP-25 cannot mediate fusion of vesicles with the host cell membrane, thus preventing the release of the neurotransmitter acetylcholine from axon endings. This blockage is slowly reversed as the toxin loses activity and the SNARE proteins are slowly regenerated by the affected cell.

The seven toxin serotypes (A–G) are traditionally separated by their antigenicity. They have different tertiary structures and sequence differences. While the different toxin types all target members of the SNARE family, different toxin types target different SNARE family members. The A, B, and E serotypes cause human botulism, with the activities of types A and B enduring longest in vivo (from several weeks to months). Existing toxin types can recombine to create "hybrid" (mosaic, chimeric) types. Examples include BoNT/CD, BoNT/DC, and BoNT/FA, with the first letter indicating the light chain type and the latter indicating the heavy chain type. BoNT/FA received considerable attention under the name "BoNT/H", as it was mistakenly thought it could not be neutralized by any existing antitoxin.

Botulinum toxins are closely related to tetanus toxin; the two are collectively known as Clostridium neurotoxins and the light chain is classified by MEROPS as family M27. Nonclassical types include BoNT/X, which is toxic in mice and possibly in humans; a BoNT/J found in cow Enterococcus; and a BoNT/Wo found in the rice-colonizing Weissella oryzae.

History

Initial descriptions and discovery of Clostridium botulinum
One of the earliest recorded outbreaks of foodborne botulism occurred in 1793 in the village of Wildbad in what is now Baden-Württemberg, Germany. Thirteen people became sick and six died after eating pork stomach filled with blood sausage, a local delicacy. Additional cases of fatal food poisoning in Württemberg led the authorities to issue a public warning against consuming smoked blood sausages in 1802 and to collect case reports of "sausage poisoning". Between 1817 and 1822, the German physician Justinus Kerner published the first complete description of the symptoms of botulism, based on extensive clinical observations and animal experiments. He concluded that the toxin develops in bad sausages under anaerobic conditions, is a biological substance, acts on the nervous system, and is lethal even in small amounts. Kerner hypothesized that this "sausage toxin" could be used to treat a variety of diseases caused by an overactive nervous system, making him the first to suggest that it could be used therapeutically. In 1870, the German physician Müller coined the term "botulism" to describe the disease caused by sausage poisoning, from the Latin word botulus, meaning "sausage".

In 1895 Émile van Ermengem, a Belgian microbiologist, discovered what is now called Clostridium botulinum and confirmed that a toxin produced by the bacteria causes botulism. On 14 December 1895, there was a large outbreak of botulism in the Belgian village of Ellezelles that occurred at a funeral where people ate pickled and smoked ham; three of them died. By examining the contaminated ham and performing autopsies on the people who died after eating it, van Ermengem isolated an anaerobic microorganism that he called Bacillus botulinus. He also performed experiments on animals with ham extracts, isolated bacterial cultures, and toxins extracts from the bacteria. From these he concluded that the bacteria themselves do not cause foodborne botulism, but rather produce a toxin that causes the disease after it is ingested. As a result of Kerner's and van Ermengem's research, it was thought that only contaminated meat or fish could cause botulism. This idea was refuted in 1904 when a botulism outbreak occurred in Darmstadt, Germany, because of canned white beans. In 1910, the German microbiologist J. Leuchs published a paper showing that the outbreaks in Ellezelles and Darmstadt were caused by different strains of Bacillus botulinus and that the toxins were serologically distinct. In 1917, Bacillus botulinus was renamed Clostridium botulinum, as it was decided that term Bacillus should only refer to a group of aerobic microorganisms, while Clostridium would be only used to describe a group of anaerobic microorganisms. In 1919, Georgina Burke used toxin-antitoxin reactions to identify two strains of Clostridium botulinum, which she designated A and B.

Food canning

Over the next three decades, 1895–1925, as food canning was approaching a billion-dollar-a-year industry, botulism was becoming a public health hazard. Karl Friedrich Meyer, a Swiss-American veterinary scientist, created a center at the Hooper Foundation in San Francisco, where he developed techniques for growing the organism and extracting the toxin, and conversely, for preventing organism growth and toxin production, and inactivating the toxin by heating. The California canning industry was thereby preserved.

World War II
With the outbreak of World War II, weaponization of botulinum toxin was investigated at Fort Detrick in Maryland. Carl Lamanna and James Duff developed the concentration and crystallization techniques that Edward J. Schantz used to create the first clinical product. When the Army's Chemical Corps was disbanded, Schantz moved to the Food Research Institute in Wisconsin, where he manufactured toxin for experimental use and provided it to the academic community.

The mechanism of botulinum toxin action – blocking the release of the neurotransmitter acetylcholine from nerve endings – was elucidated in the mid-20th century, and remains an important research topic. Nearly all toxin treatments are based on this effect in various body tissues.

Strabismus
Ophthalmologists specializing in eye muscle disorders (strabismus) had developed the method of EMG-guided injection (using the electromyogram, the electrical signal from an activated muscle, to guide injection) of local anesthetics as a diagnostic technique for evaluating an individual muscle's contribution to an eye movement. Because strabismus surgery frequently needed repeating, a search was undertaken for non-surgical, injection treatments using various anesthetics, alcohols, enzymes, enzyme blockers, and snake neurotoxins. Finally, inspired by Daniel B. Drachman's work with chicks at Johns Hopkins, Alan B. Scott and colleagues injected botulinum toxin into monkey extraocular muscles. The result was remarkable; a few picograms induced paralysis that was confined to the target muscle, long in duration, and without side effects.

After working out techniques for freeze-drying, buffering with albumin, and assuring sterility, potency, and safety, Scott applied to the FDA for investigational drug use, and began manufacturing botulinum type A neurotoxin in his San Francisco lab. He injected the first strabismus patients in 1977, reported its clinical utility in 1980, and had soon trained hundreds of ophthalmologists in EMG-guided injection of the drug he named Oculinum ("eye aligner").

In 1986, Oculinum Inc, Scott's micromanufacturer and distributor of botulinum toxin, was unable to obtain product liability insurance, and could no longer supply the drug. As supplies became exhausted, patients who had come to rely on periodic injections became desperate. For four months, as liability issues were resolved, American blepharospasm patients traveled to Canadian eye centers for their injections.

Based on data from thousands of patients collected by 240 investigators, Oculinum Inc (which was soon acquired by Allergan) received FDA approval in 1989 to market Oculinum for clinical use in the United States to treat adult strabismus and blepharospasm. Allergan then began using the trademark Botox. This original approval was granted under the 1983 US Orphan Drug Act.

Cosmetics

The effect of botulinum toxin type-A on reducing and eliminating forehead wrinkles was first described and published by Richard Clark, MD, a plastic surgeon from Sacramento, California. In 1987 Clark was challenged with eliminating the disfigurement caused by only the right side of the forehead muscles functioning after the left side of the forehead was paralyzed during a facelift procedure. This patient had desired to look better from her facelift, but was experiencing bizarre unilateral right forehead eyebrow elevation while the left eyebrow drooped, and she constantly demonstrated deep expressive right forehead wrinkles while the left side was perfectly smooth due to the paralysis. Clark was aware that Botulinum toxin was safely being used to treat babies with strabismus and he requested and was granted FDA approval to experiment with Botulinum toxin to paralyze the moving and wrinkling normal functioning right forehead muscles to make both sides of the forehead appear the same. This study and case report of the cosmetic use of Botulinum toxin to treat a cosmetic complication of a cosmetic surgery was the first report on the specific treatment of wrinkles and was published in the journal Plastic and Reconstructive Surgery in 1989. Editors of the journal of the American Society of Plastic Surgeons have clearly stated "the first described use of the toxin in aesthetic circumstances was by Clark and Berris in 1989."

Jean and Alastair Carruthers observed that blepharospasm patients who received injections around the eyes and upper face also enjoyed diminished facial glabellar lines ("frown lines" between the eyebrows). Alastair Carruthers reported that others at the time also noticed these effects and discussed the cosmetic potential of botulinum toxin. Unlike other investigators, the Carruthers did more than just talk about the possibility of using botulinum toxin cosmetically. They conducted a clinical study on otherwise normal individuals whose only concern was their eyebrow furrow. They performed their study during 1987-1989 and presented their results at the 1990 annual meeting of the American Society for Dermatologic Surgery. Their findings were subsequently published in 1992.

Chronic pain

William J. Binder reported in 2000, that patients who had cosmetic injections around the face reported relief from chronic headache. This was initially thought to be an indirect effect of reduced muscle tension, but the toxin is now known to inhibit release of peripheral nociceptive neurotransmitters, suppressing the central pain processing systems responsible for migraine headache.

Society and culture

Economics

, botulinum toxin injections are the most common cosmetic operation, with 7.4 million procedures in the United States, according to the American Society of Plastic Surgeons. Qualifications for Botox injectors vary by county, state, and country. Botox cosmetic providers include dermatologists, plastic surgeons, aesthetic spa physicians, dentists, nurse practitioners, nurses, and physician assistants.

The global market for botulinum toxin products, driven by their cosmetic applications, was forecast to reach $2.9 billion by 2018. The facial aesthetics market, of which they are a component, was forecast to reach $4.7 billion ($2 billion in the U.S.) in the same timeframe.

US Market In 2020, 4,401,536 Botulinum Toxin Type A procedures were administered. In 2019 the botulinum Toxin market made US$3.19 billion.

Botox cost Botox cost is generally determined by the number of units administered (avg. $10.00 - $30.00 per unit) or by the area ($200–1000) and depends on expertise of a physician, clinic location, number of units, and treatment complexity. 

Insurance Botox for medical purposes is usually covered by insurance if deemed medically necessary by your doctor and covers a plethora of medical problems including overactive bladder (OAB), urinary incontinence due to neurologic conditions, headaches and migraines, TMJ, spasticity in adult patients, cervical dystonia in adult patients, severe axillary hyperhidrosis (or other areas of the body), blepharospasm, upper or lower limb spasticity.

Migraines For migraine induced headaches the FDA-recommended dosage is 155 units and costs between $300 to $600 per treatment out of pocket when covered by insurance.

Hyperhidrosis Botox for excessive sweating is FDA approved.

Cosmetic Standard areas for aesthetics botox injections include facial and other areas that can form fine lines and wrinkles due to every day muscle contractions and/or facial expressions such as smiling, frowning, squinting, and raising eyebrows. These areas include the glabellar region between the eyebrows, horizontal lines on the forehead, crow's feet around the eyes, and even circular bands that form around the neck secondary to platysmal hyperactivity.

Bioterrorism
Botulinum toxin has been recognized as a potential agent for use in bioterrorism. It can be absorbed through the eyes, mucous membranes, respiratory tract, and non-intact skin.
The effects of botulinum toxin are different from those of nerve agents involved insofar in that botulism symptoms develop relatively slowly (over several days), while nerve agent effects are generally much more rapid. Evidence suggests that nerve exposure (simulated by injection of atropine and pralidoxime) will increase mortality by enhancing botulinum toxin's mechanism of toxicity.
With regard to detection, protocols using NBC detection equipment (such as M-8 paper or the ICAM) will not indicate a "positive" when samples containing botulinum toxin are tested. To confirm a diagnosis of botulinum toxin poisoning, therapeutically or to provide evidence in death investigations, botulinum toxin may be quantitated by immunoassay of human biological fluids; serum levels of 12–24 mouse LD50 units per milliliter have been detected in poisoned patients.

Japanese doomsday cult Aum Shinrikyo produced botulinum toxin and spread it as an aerosol in downtown Tokyo during the 1990s, but the attacks caused no fatalities.

During the early 1980s, German and French newspapers reported that the police had raided a Baader-Meinhof gang safe house in Paris and had found a makeshift laboratory that contained flasks full of Clostridium botulinum, which makes botulinum toxin. Their reports were later found to be incorrect; no such lab was ever found.

Brand names

Botulinum toxin A is sold under the brand names Jeuveau, Botox, and Xeomin. Botulinum toxin B is sold under the brand name Myobloc.

In the United States, botulinum toxin products are manufactured by a variety of companies, for both therapeutic and cosmetic use. A U.S. supplier reported in its company materials in 2011 that it could "supply the world's requirements for 25 indications approved by Government agencies around the world" with less than one gram of raw botulinum toxin. Myobloc or Neurobloc, a botulinum toxin type B product, is produced by Solstice Neurosciences, a subsidiary of US WorldMeds. AbobotulinumtoxinA), a therapeutic formulation of the type A toxin manufactured by Galderma in the United Kingdom, is licensed for the treatment of focal dystonias and certain cosmetic uses in the U.S. and other countries.

Besides the three primary U.S. manufacturers, numerous other botulinum toxin producers are known. Xeomin, manufactured in Germany by Merz, is also available for both therapeutic and cosmetic use in the U.S. Lanzhou Institute of Biological Products in China manufactures a botulinum toxin type-A product; as of 2014, it was the only botulinum toxin type-A approved in China. Botulinum toxin type-A is also sold as Lantox and Prosigne on the global market. Neuronox, a botulinum toxin type-A product, was introduced by Medy-Tox Inc. of South Korea in 2009.

Toxin production
Botulism toxins are produced by bacteria of the genus Clostridium, namely C. botulinum, C. butyricum, C. baratii and C. argentinense, which are widely distributed, including in soil and dust. Also, the bacteria can be found inside homes on floors, carpet, and countertops even after cleaning.
Food-borne botulism results, indirectly, from ingestion of food contaminated with Clostridium spores, where exposure to an anaerobic environment allows the spores to germinate, after which the bacteria can multiply and produce toxin. Critically, ingestion of toxin rather than spores or vegetative bacteria causes botulism. Botulism is nevertheless known to be transmitted through canned foods not cooked correctly before canning or after can opening, so is preventable. Infant botulism arising from consumption of honey or any other food that can carry these spores can be prevented by eliminating these foods from diets of children less than 12 months old.

Organism and toxin susceptibilities

Proper refrigeration at temperatures below  slows the growth of C. botulinum. The organism is also susceptible to high salt, high oxygen, and low pH levels. The toxin itself is rapidly destroyed by heat, such as in thorough cooking. The spores that produce the toxin are heat-tolerant and will survive boiling water for an extended period of time.

As a zinc metalloprotease (see below), the toxin's activity is also susceptible, post-exposure, to inhibition by protease inhibitors, e.g., zinc-coordinating hydroxamates.

Research

Blepharospasm and strabismus

University-based ophthalmologists in the US and Canada further refined the use of botulinum toxin as a therapeutic agent. By 1985, a scientific protocol of injection sites and dosage had been empirically determined for treatment of blepharospasm and strabismus. Side effects in treatment of this condition were deemed to be rare, mild and treatable. The beneficial effects of the injection lasted only 4–6 months. Thus, blepharospasm patients required re-injection two or three times a year.

In 1986, Scott's micromanufacturer and distributor of Botox was no longer able to supply the drug because of an inability to obtain product liability insurance. Patients became desperate, as supplies of Botox were gradually consumed, forcing him to abandon patients who would have been due for their next injection. For a period of four months, American blepharospasm patients had to arrange to have their injections performed by participating doctors at Canadian eye centers until the liability issues could be resolved.

In December 1989, Botox was approved by the U.S. FDA for the treatment of strabismus, blepharospasm, and hemifacial spasm in patients over 12 years old.

In the case of treatment of infantile esotropia in patients younger than 12 years of age, several studies have yielded differing results.

Cosmetic

The effect of botulinum toxin type-A on reducing and eliminating forehead wrinkles was first described and published by Richard Clark, MD a plastic surgeon from Sacramento, California. In 1987 Clark was challenged with eliminating the disfigurement caused by only the right side of the forehead muscles functioning after the left side of the forehead was paralyzed during a facelift procedure. This patient had desired to look better from her facelift, but was experiencing bizarre unilateral right forehead eyebrow elevation while the left eyebrow drooped and she emoted with deep expressive right forehead wrinkles while the left side was perfectly smooth due to the paralysis. Clark was aware that Botulinum toxin was safely being used to treat babies with strabismus and he requested and was granted FDA approval to experiment with Botulinum toxin to paralyze the moving and wrinkling normal functioning right forehead muscles to make both sides of the forehead appear the same. This study and case report of the Cosmetic use of Botulinum toxin to treat a Cosmetic complication of a Cosmetic surgery was the first report on the specific treatment of wrinkles and was published in the journal Plastic and Reconstructive Surgery in 1989. Editors of the journal of the American Society of Plastic Surgeons have clearly stated "the first described use of the toxin in aesthetic circumstances was by Clark and Berris in 1989."

JD and JA Carruthers also studied and reported in 1992 the use of botulinum toxin type-A as a cosmetic treatment.[78] They conducted a study of patients whose only concern was their glabellar forehead wrinkle or furrow. Study participants were otherwise normal. Sixteen of seventeen patients available for follow-up demonstrated a cosmetic improvement. This study was reported at a meeting in 1991. The study for the treatment of glabellar frown lines was published in 1992. This result was subsequently confirmed by other groups (Brin, and the Columbia University group under Monte Keen). The FDA announced regulatory approval of botulinum toxin type A (Botox Cosmetic) to temporarily improve the appearance of moderate-to-severe frown lines between the eyebrows (glabellar lines) in 2002 after extensive clinical trials. Well before this, the cosmetic use of botulinum toxin type A became widespread. The results of Botox Cosmetic can last up to four months and may vary with each patient. The US Food and Drug Administration (FDA) approved an alternative product-safety testing method in response to increasing public concern that LD50 testing was required for each batch sold in the market.

Botulinum toxin type-A has also been used in the treatment of gummy smiles, the material is injected into the hyperactive muscles of upper lip, which causes a reduction in the upward movement of lip thus resulting in a smile with a less exposure of gingiva. Botox is usually injected in the three lip elevator muscles that converge on the lateral side of the ala of the nose; the levator labii superioris (LLS), the levator labii superioris alaeque nasi muscle (LLSAN), and the zygomaticus minor (ZMi).

Upper motor neuron syndrome
Botulinum toxin type-A is now a common treatment for muscles affected by the upper motor neuron syndrome (UMNS), such as cerebral palsy, for muscles with an impaired ability to effectively lengthen. Muscles affected by UMNS frequently are limited by weakness, loss of reciprocal inhibition, decreased movement control, and hypertonicity (including spasticity). In January 2014, Botulinum toxin was approved by UK's Medicines and Healthcare products Regulatory Agency (MHRA) for the treatment of ankle disability due to lower limb spasticity associated with stroke in adults. Joint motion may be restricted by severe muscle imbalance related to the syndrome, when some muscles are markedly hypertonic, and lack effective active lengthening. Injecting an overactive muscle to decrease its level of contraction can allow improved reciprocal motion, so improved ability to move and exercise.

Sialorrhea
Sialorrhea is a condition where oral secretions are unable to be eliminated, causing pooling of saliva in the mouth. This condition can be caused by various neurological syndromes such as Bell's palsy, intellectual disability, and cerebral palsy. Injection of botulinum toxin type-A into salivary glands is useful in reducing the secretions.

Cervical dystonia
Botulinum toxin type-A is used to treat cervical dystonia, but it can become ineffective after a time. Botulinum toxin type B received FDA approval for treatment of cervical dystonia in December 2000. Brand names for botulinum toxin type-B include Myobloc in the United States and Neurobloc in the European Union.

Chronic migraine

Onabotulinumtoxin A (trade name Botox) received FDA approval for treatment of chronic migraines on 15 October 2010. The toxin is injected into the head and neck to treat these chronic headaches. Approval followed evidence presented to the agency from two studies funded by Allergan showing a very slight improvement in incidence of chronic migraines for those with migraines undergoing the Botox treatment.

Since then, several randomized control trials have shown botulinum toxin type A to improve headache symptoms and quality of life when used prophylactically for patients with chronic migraine who exhibit headache characteristics consistent with: pressure perceived from outside source, shorter total duration of chronic migraines (<30 years), "detoxification" of patients with coexisting chronic daily headache due to medication overuse, and no current history of other preventive headache medications.

Depression

A few small trials have found benefits in people with depression. Research is based on the facial feedback hypothesis.

Premature ejaculation

The drug for the treatment of premature ejaculation has been under development since 7 August 2013, and is in Phase II of the FDA trials.

References

Further reading

External links 
 BotDB: extensive resources on BoNT structures, inhibitors, kinetics, and literature
 
 
 
 
 
 
 
 
 
 
 
 F.D.A. OKs Daxxify, an Anti-Wrinkle Drug and Botox Competitor The New York Times

AbbVie brands
Acetylcholine release inhibitors
Bacterial toxins
Biological toxin weapons
Botulism
EC 3.4.24
Muscle relaxants
Neurotoxins
Peripherally selective drugs
Plastic surgery
Protein domains